was a Japanese actress. She appeared in over 100 films.

Biography
She graduated from Waseda University School of Letters and Art and Sciences with B.A. degree.

Ichihara was a member of the Haiyuza theater troupe from 1957 to 1971. She won an award at the Geijutsusai in 1959 and became the star of Haiyuza. She narrated the long-running anime series Manga Nihon mukashi banashi. She won the Japan Academy Prize for Black Rain. Ichihara died of heart failure, twelve days before her 83rd birthday.

Filmography

Film

Television

References

External links

1936 births
2019 deaths
Voice actors from Chiba (city)
Voice actresses from Chiba Prefecture
Actors from Chiba Prefecture
Japanese film actresses
Japanese stage actresses
Japanese television actresses
Japanese voice actresses